Pakistan–France relations are the bilateral, cultural, and international relations between Pakistan and France. The relationships are based on military, defence, cultural, educational cooperation and economic ties. Trade between the two countries is generally increasing with time.

History

The foreign relations between Pakistan and France were first established on 31 July 1951 when both countries agreed to open embassy services in each countries. France was one of the first non-Muslim states to recognize Pakistan, opening its embassy about 2 months after Pakistani independence In August 1960, a farewell trade treaty was signed; followed by import-export treaty that was concluded October 1966. During the Cold war, France considered Pakistan as "state deserving attention", and had been a major foreign supplier of Pakistan Armed Forces.

After the Cold war, France's foreign policy has been noted for decades for its
special Gaullist flavour, which was not much altered under the long Presidency of socialist François Mitterrand (1981-1995). French Presidents visited India more often than Pakistan, and Paris has never met the expectations of Islamabad regarding the U.N. resolutions on Kashmir. The relations again suffered many set back in 1998-99 when Paris saw the Kargil episode as a dangerous Pakistan initiative, considering the new nuclearised regional context. Though, France has always been to encourage dialogue between India and Pakistan, without offering mediation in such an intricate issue. There was some impatience in Paris decision-makers circles when the Line of Control was crossed above Kargil in an obviously well prepared operation.

Military and strategic cooperation
Since 1967, France had been an important partner, particularly for PAF and the Navy. In 1967, France sold first batch of its Mirage fighters as well as sold the submarine technology to Pakistan. The PAF bought second-hand batch of Mirage fighters in 1990; followed by a contract signing in 1996 for the acquisition of 40 reconnaissance aircraft. The PAF is the largest customer of France's aerospace industry with numbers of fighter and civilian aircraft having been sold to Pakistan since 1967 till the 2000s. The Navy has also an established defence connection with France, the best known purchasing of Daphné class submarine and the submarine technology transfer of the Agost class which was signed in 1994.

In 2009, France agreed to provide financial capital to expand the use of nuclear power in Pakistan. While, the officials at Islamabad termed it as "significant move", the Foreign service office maintained that: "France has agreed to transfer civilian nuclear technology to Pakistan."  The French Foreign ministry had confirmed that the country was ready, within the framework of its international agreements, to "co-operate with Pakistan" in the field of nuclear safety. "This is so the Pakistan's programme can develop in the best conditions of safety and security", the French foreign officials added to APP. After the agreement, France maintained that "this is the beginning of a civil nuclear partnership and the cooperation will be limited to nuclear safety."

In May 2011, France stopped selling heavy military equipment to Pakistan in order to ease Indian concerns. During a visit to India, the French defence minister Gérard Longuet said France did not want to be seen "feeding Pakistan’s military ambitions".

Trade and economic relations
The first trade agreement was signed in 1966, and Pakistan is currently ranked as 65th import partner of France.  The bilateral trade was reached to US$313 million in 2009.

Charlie Hebdo protests
In 2020, thousands of protesters opposing France's defense of freedom of speech held rallies in cities across Pakistan, against the re-publishing of the Charlie Hebdo cartoons of the Islamic prophet Muhammed, including publishing controversial images. They called on the Pakistani government to cut diplomatic and trade ties with France, which was quickly reported on by TRT World. The protesters burnt the French flag and said they were willing to avenge what they considered to be blasphemy against Muhammed in a peaceful way.

In April 2021, the French government advised French nationals and French companies to temporarily leave Pakistan amid violent anti-French protests by the TLP party and meanwhile the Government of Pakistan clearly told the TLP party that Pakistan will not tell the French ambassador to leave the country and the Government will protect the French friendship at any cost. Thus then, Pakistan banned the radical far-right TLP party.

Visit to France by Pakistani Army Chief
From 13 June 2022 to 17 June 2022, COAS Qamar Javed Bajwa attended the Eurosatory International Defence and Security exhibition. No protest was held by the Tehreek-e-Labbaik Pakistan nor did they condemn it. Further cementing and confirming that the party has close links to the military.

See also 
 Foreign relations of France 
 Foreign relations of Pakistan
 Mehmood Bhatti (fashion designer)
 Musa Javed Chohan: former ambassador of Pakistan to France and recipient of the Ordre National du Merite for the promotion of bilateral cooperation between France and Pakistan.
 French people in Pakistan
 Karachi affair
 Pakistanis in France

References

 
Pakistan 
Bilateral relations of Pakistan